Iperó is a municipality in the state of São Paulo in Brazil. It is part of the Metropolitan Region of Sorocaba. The population is 37,964 (2020 est.) in an area of 170.29 km². The elevation is 590 m. The Sorocaba River flows near Iperó. Iperó is accessed with the highway SP-280.

Population history

Demographics

According to the 2000 IBGE Census, the population was 18,384, of which 12,649 are urban and 5,735 are rural. The average life expectancy was 72.42 years. The literacy rate was 91.8%.

References

External links
  http://www.ipero.sp.gov.br
  Iperó on citybrazil.com.br

Municipalities in São Paulo (state)